Decentralized identifiers (DIDs) are a type of globally unique identifier that enables an entity to be identified in a manner that is verifiable, persistent (as long as the DID controller desires), and does not require the use of a centralized registry. DIDs enable a new model of decentralized digital identity that is often referred to as self-sovereign identity or decentralized identity. They are an important component of decentralized web applications.

DID documents 
A decentralized identifier resolves (points) to a DID document, a set of data describing the DID subject, including mechanisms, such as cryptographic public keys, that the DID subject or a DID delegate can use to authenticate itself and prove its association with the DID.

DID methods 
Just as there are many different types of URIs, all of which conform to the URI standard, there are many different types of DID methods, all of which must conform to the DID standard. Each DID method specification must define:
 The name of the DID method (which must appear between the first and second colon, e.g., did:example:).
 The structure of the unique identifier that must follow the second colon.
 The technical specifications for how a DID resolver can apply the CRUD operations to create, read, update, and deactivate a DID document using that method.

The W3C DID Working Group maintains a registry of DID methods.

Usage of DIDs 
A DID identifies any subject (e.g., a person, organization, thing, data model, abstract entity, etc.) that the controller of the DID decides that it identifies. DIDs are designed to enable the controller of a DID to prove control over it and to be implemented independently of any centralized registry, identity provider, or certificate authority. DIDs are URIs that associate a DID subject with a DID document. Each DID document can express cryptographic material, verification methods, and service endpoints to enable trusted interactions associated with the DID subject. A DID document might contain additional semantics about the subject that it identifies. A DID document might also contain the DID subject itself (e.g. a data model).

Standardization efforts 
The W3C DID Working Group developed a specification for decentralized identifiers to standardize the core architecture, data model, and representation of DIDs.

The W3C approved the DID 1.0 specification as a W3C Recommendation on July 19, 2022.

See also 
Self-sovereign identity

External links 
 https://identity.foundation/
 https://trustoverip.org/
 https://www.hyperledger.org/use/hyperledger-indy
 https://www.hyperledger.org/use/hyperledger-aries
 https://sovrin.org/
 The 10 principles of Self Sovereign Identity
 https://irma.app/

References 

Authentication protocols
Authentication methods
Identity management
Digital technology
Federated identity
Computer access control
Decentralization